Manuel Bonaque Acevedo (born 9 May 1991) is a Spanish footballer who plays for Mérida AD mainly as a central defender.

Club career
Born in Huelva, Andalusia, Bonaque made his senior debut in 2009, going on to appear in several Tercera División seasons with the reserve team. On 26 November 2011, he made his debut with the main squad, starting in a 1–2 Segunda División home loss against Xerez CD.

On 21 January 2012, Bonaque again played the full 90 minutes as he scored his first goal as a professional, but Recre lost 1–3 at FC Cartagena. In January 2013, he was loaned to Villarreal CF B after renewing his contract for a further two seasons.

Bonaque signed with UD Almería B of Segunda División B on 1 August 2013. On 21 August of the following year, he transferred to fellow league club Real Avilés.

On 13 January 2015, Bonaque terminated his contract with Avilés and moved abroad for the first time in his career, joining Maltese Premier League side Tarxien Rainbows FC.

On 17 June 2021, Banque joined Mérida AD.

References

External links

1989 births
Living people
Spanish footballers
Footballers from Huelva
Association football defenders
Segunda División players
Segunda División B players
Tercera División players
Atlético Onubense players
Recreativo de Huelva players
Villarreal CF B players
UD Almería B players
Real Avilés CF footballers
CD San Roque de Lepe footballers
Caudal Deportivo footballers
CF Lorca Deportiva players
UD Los Barrios footballers
CF Villanovense players
Maltese Premier League players
Tarxien Rainbows F.C. players
Mérida AD players
Spanish expatriate footballers
Expatriate footballers in Malta
Spanish expatriate sportspeople in Malta